Roland System-1 is a Plug-Out Synthesizer, based on the System 100, System 100M, and the System 700.

In short, the System-1 has two oscillators to produce sounds. They can ring modulate each other. There is also an LFO to modulate the other 2 oscillators. This all can produce a wide variation of sounds.

In a mixer the sounds of the 2 oscillators can be mixed with a sub-oscillator and a noise generator; a filter-section puts an ADSR envelope (Attack, Decay, Sustain, Release) to the sounds. An Amp-section can influence the volume output, using an ADSR envelope too. Both ADSR are controlled each by 4 sliders.

As with the other Aira products, the System-1 has a Scatter function, which can reform the sounds to more variations.

Features

External links
 Roland - official site

References 

Aira